Battle of Villmergen may refer to either of two battles between the Reformed and Catholic cantons of Switzerland fought at Villmergen in the canton of Aargau:
  

a battle of the First War of Villmergen, fought on 24 January 1656
a battle of the Toggenburg War (or Second War of Villmergen), fought on 24 July 1712

See also
Battles of the Old Swiss Confederacy